U.S. Sugar 148, formerly Florida East Coast 148, is a 4-6-2 steam locomotive built in April 1920 by the American Locomotive Company (ALCO) of Richmond, Virginia, originally for the Florida East Coast Railway (FEC). It hauled passenger and freight trains on the FEC's Overseas Railroad to Key West, Florida until the line was destroyed in 1935. The locomotive was sold in 1952 to U.S. Sugar Corporation (USSC) to haul sugarcane trains in Clewiston, Florida.

During the 1970s, No. 148 was sold again to New Jersey, where it served excursion service on the Black River and Western (BR&W) and Morristown and Erie (ME) railroads. Between 1983 and 2005, the locomotive was sold multiple times to various different owners in Connecticut, Michigan, and Colorado who have attempted to restore No. 148 to operation but never succeeded.

In late 2016, USSC reacquired the No. 148 locomotive and restored it to operating condition by 2020 for use in excursion service on their South Central Florida Express shortline railroad as part of their heritage tourist passenger train named the Sugar Express, taking visitors all around the Lake Okeechobee counties.

History

Revenue service on the FEC and U.S. Sugar

No. 148 was the eighth member of ten 4-6-2 Light Pacific class 141 steam locomotives built by the American Locomotive Company (ALCO) of Richmond, Virginia in April 1920 for the Florida East Coast Railway (FEC). It was assigned to haul passenger and freight trains on the FEC's Overseas Railroad between Miami and Key West, Florida until 1935 when the Labor Day Hurricane destroyed many of the route's long bridges and the FEC permanently closed it down due to the Great Depression. During that time, the FEC began to retire most of their older 4-6-2 locomotives for scrap or selling them to other railroads in order to recoup their financial losses. No. 148 remained in service with the FEC until June 1952, when it was sold to U.S. Sugar Corporation (USSC) in Clewiston, Florida, where it worked alongside its sister locomotives Nos. 98, 113, and 153 to haul sugarcane trains from the harvest field to USSC's sugarcane mills.

Excursion service in New Jersey and changing ownerships
In the 1960s, USSC began to retire most of their steam locomotives in favor of diesel power, including No. 148 who was the last one to be removed from the USSC roster. In September 1968, it was purchased by Sam Freeman, who restored it to operation in 1970 to use the locomotive in excursion service on the Black River and Western Railroad in Ringoes, New Jersey. In 1973, the No. 148 locomotive was sent to the New Hope and Ivyland Railroad workshop in New Hope, Pennsylvania, for repair work to its boiler and running gear. In 1974, it was moved to the Morristown and Erie Railway, which ran along the Whippany River and  out of Whippany, New Jersey. In September 1975, No. 148 took part in recreating the Jersey Central's Blue Comet train on former Erie trackage. On that same year of December, No. 148 made a guest appearance in one of The Tomorrow Show segments, featuring the show's host Tom Snyder.

When No. 148 became inoperable in 1977 and Freeman died in 1983, it was donated to the Valley Railroad in Essex, Connecticut and was sold off five years later to a private owner in Traverse City, Michigan. In 2005, No. 148 was purchased by the Denver and Rio Grande Historical Foundation in Monte Vista, Colorado, who originally planned to restore and operate the locomotive for tourist operations on the former Denver and Rio Grande Western branch line between South Fork and Creede, Colorado, but never succeeded it due to the Great Recession in 2008.

Current excursion service with U.S. Sugar

In late 2016, USSC CEO Robert H. Buker, Jr. reacquired the No. 148 locomotive and restored it to operating condition for use in excursion service as part of the new Sugar Express tourist passenger train running on the South Central Florida Express main line. During the restoration work, which started in early 2017, No. 148 received a lot of fabrication work to its wheelset, crankpins, and bearing boxes. Additionally, it was given a new front boiler course and smokebox, which were both completely welded.

In April 2020, after an extensive restoration work with assistance from FMW Solutions, Steam Operations Corporation, and Continental Fabricators Inc, No. 148 moved under its own power for the first time in 43 years. It began its first revenue service on that same year of May 28, pulling the last sugarcane train of USSC's 2019–2020 harvest season. On October 1, 2020, No. 148 kickstarted USSC's 90th harvest season and was christened with a bottle of champagne by Buker's wife Barbara. On December 12, 2021, No. 148 ran its first Sugar Express public excursion train, the Lake Placid Limited from Clewiston to Lake Placid, Florida and back. 

On January 29-30, 2022, USSC and Trains Magazine hosted a private photo charter of the No. 148 locomotive pulling passenger and freight consists. On that same year of April 9-10, No. 148 pulled its second excursion train, the Moore Haven Meteor from Clewiston to Moore Haven, Florida and back. On April 23-25, 2022, No. 148 hauled a consist of eight different heritage passenger cars for the American Association of Private Railroad Car Owners' (AAPRCO) special Sugarland Limited train on a multi-day tour around the Lake Okeechobee counties. Afterwards, No. 148 pulled more of USSC's Sugar Express excursions around late 2022 to mid 2023.

See also
Atlantic Coast Line 1504
Black River and Western 60
Maine Central 470
Santa Fe 1316
Southern Pacific 2467
Savannah and Atlanta 750

References

Bibliography

External links

Sugar Express - official website of Sugar Express

4-6-2 locomotives
ALCO locomotives
Florida East Coast Railway
Preserved steam locomotives of Florida
Railway locomotives introduced in 1920
Standard gauge locomotives of the United States
Steam locomotives of the United States